Fox (TV Channel) may refer to:

 Fox (British and Irish TV channel), owned by the Fox Networks Group (Disney)
 Fox (Finnish TV channel), owned by the Fox Networks Group (Disney)
 Fox Broadcasting Company, an American broadcast television network, owned by Fox Corporation
 Fox Sports Networks, the name for a group of regional cable sports stations in the United States
 Fox Business Network, an American cable and satellite business news television channel, owned by Fox Corporation
 Fox News, a cable television network owned by Fox Corporation
 Fox Sports (Australia), owned by a division of Foxtel (News Corp/Telstra)
 Fox Sports (Netherlands), former name of ESPN (Netherlands)
 Fox Sports (United States), the sports programming division of Fox Corporation responsible for sports broadcasts on the Fox network, including:
 Fox Sports 1, an American sports network owned by Fox Corporation
 Fox Sports 2

See also 
 Foxes (disambiguation)
 Foxe (disambiguation)
 Fox (disambiguation)